Văleni is a commune in Olt County, Muntenia, Romania. It is composed of four villages: Mandra, Popești, Tirișneag and Văleni.

References

Communes in Olt County
Localities in Muntenia